Tupelo is a genus of trees.

Tupelo may also refer to:

Places
 Tupelo, Arkansas, a town in Jackson County, Arkansas, United States
 Tupelo, Mississippi, the county seat and the largest city of Lee County, Mississippi
 Tupelo, Oklahoma, a city in Coal County, Oklahoma, United States

Ships
 USCGC Tupelo (WLB-303), a Cactus (A) Class 180 foot buoy tender
 USS Tupelo (YN-75), an Ailanthus-class net laying ship later renamed the USS Winterberry (AN-56)

Music
 Uncle Tupelo, band
 "Tupelo" (song), 1985 the second single by Australian post-punk band Nick Cave and the Bad Seeds
"Tupelo", song by John Lee Hooker from Chill Out 1995, originally released in 1962
 "Back to Tupelo" song, Mark Knopfler

Other
 Tupelo Press, an American not-for-profit literary press founded in 1999

See also
 Tupelo Honey, a 1971 album by Van Morrison